The Scottish Conservative and Unionist Students is the former student wing of the Scottish Conservative and Unionist Party.  In 2005 it merged with its sister organisation, the Scottish Young Conservatives to become, in line with UK-wide youth wing Conservative Future (CF), Conservative Future Scotland.

Conservative Future
Young
Student wings of political parties in Scotland
Student wings of conservative parties